Telegatto (a composition of television and gatto, meaning "cat", after the trophy, which is a little statue representing a cat), was an Italian television award first conceived in 1971 following the contest Gran Premio internazionale dello Spettacolo, though the first award ceremony wasn't held until 1984. It was sponsored by the weekly magazine TV Sorrisi e Canzoni and broadcast on Canale 5. The prize was a golden cat statue with the network's initials on its face. It was inspired by a cartoon from the television series Super Classifica Show, a cult show in the 1980s and early 1990s. The award ceremony was cancelled in 2009.

On 12 March 2018, on the occasion of a press conference for the photography book dedicated to the event, and a decade after the last edition, the director of TV Sorrisi e Canzoni, Aldo Vitali, hypothesized the return of the event in Milan for October of the same year, to be hosted by Carlo Conti. The show, however, never resurfaced.

Hosts
 1984 Mike Bongiorno, Cinzia Lenzi, Gabriella Golia, Fabrizia Carminati
 1985 Mike Bongiorno, Cinzia Lenzi, Gabriella Golia, Alessandra Buzzi, Susanna Messaggio, Fiorella Pierobon
 1986 Mike Bongiorno, Milly Carlucci
 1987 Mike Bongiorno, Carol Alt, Renée Simonsen
 1988 Mike Bongiorno, Gabriella Carlucci
 1989 Mike Bongiorno, Heather Parisi
 1990 Corrado, Elisabetta Gardini
 1991 Corrado, Raffaella Carrà
 1992 Corrado, Fabrizio Frizzi and Antonella Elia
 1993 Corrado, Milly Carlucci
 1994 Corrado, Alba Parietti
 1995 Corrado, Mara Venier
 1996 Corrado, Mara Venier
 1997 Pippo Baudo, Milly Carlucci
 1998 Pippo Baudo, Milly Carlucci
 1999 Pippo Baudo, Milly Carlucci
 2000 Paolo Bonolis, Raffaella Carrà
 2001 Gerry Scotti, Maria De Filippi
 2002 Pippo Baudo, Alessia Marcuzzi
 2003 Pippo Baudo, Alessia Marcuzzi
 2004 Gerry Scotti, Raffaella Carrà
 2005 Suspended
 2006 Pippo Baudo, Michelle Hunziker
 2007 Claudio Bisio, Vanessa Incontrada
 2008 Pippo Baudo, Michelle Hunziker

American Telegatto winners
 Dallas – 1984
 Raiders of the Lost Ark – 1985
 Quo Vadis? – 1985
 Dallas – 1985
 V- Visitors – 1985 (union of V and V: The Final Battle)
 Dynasty – 1985
 V- Visitors – 1986
 Dallas – 1986
 awarded to Joan Collins for Dynasty – 1986
 North and South – 1987
 Dallas – 1987
 Capitol – 1987 (special award)
 Dynasty – 1988
 Guiding Light – 1988
 Dynasty – 1989
 Happy Days – 1989 (special award)
 Fame – 1989 (special award)
 Loving – 1989 'special award)
 awarded to Sylvester Stallone  – 1990
 awarded to Edward Asner for Lou Grant  – 1990
 The Young and the Restless – 1990 (special award)
 Twin Peaks – 1991
 The Bold and the Beautiful – 1991
 awarded to Robert Mitchum  – 1991
 awarded to Robert De Niro  – 1991
 Miami Vice – 1992
 MacGyver – 1992
 awarded to Arnold Schwarzenegger – 1992
 awarded to Madonna – 1992
 Perry Mason – 1993
 Beverly Hills, 90210 – 1993
 awarded to Dustin Hoffman – 1993
 awarded to Michael Douglas – 1993
 Columbo – 1994
 Beverly Hills, 90210 – 1994
 Magnum, P.I. – 1994
 The Bold and the Beautiful – 1994
 Beverly Hills, 90210 – 1995
 awarded to Kirk Douglas – 1995 (Platinum Award)
 awarded to Steven Seagal – 1995
 awarded to Tony Curtis – 1996 (Platinum Award)
 Dallas – 1996
 The X-Files – 1996
 The Bold and the Beautiful – 1996
 awarded to Joe Pesci – 1996 (Platinum Award)
 ER – 1997
 The Bold and the Beautiful – 1997
 awarded to Eli Wallach – 1997 (Platinum Award)
 Murder, She Wrote – 1999
 awarded to James Coburn – 2000
 The Simpsons – 2000
 awarded to George Clooney – 2000
 awarded to Elizabeth Taylor – 2001
 awarded to Robert Wagner – 2001
 awarded to Sean Connery – 2002
 awarded to Peter O'Toole – 2002
 awarded to Ernest Borgnine – 2003
 CSI: Crime Scene Investigation – 2003
 awarded to Susan Sarandon – 2003

References

Italian television awards